The following is a list of characters that first appeared in the Channel 4 soap opera Hollyoaks in 2006, in order of first appearance.

Mike Barnes

Mike Barnes is a fictional character from the soap opera Hollyoaks, played by famous Coronation Street actor, Tony Hirst.

Michaela McQueen

Ste Hay

Sean Kennedy

Mrs. Webster 

Mrs. Webster was the head teacher at Hollyoaks High School. She spoke to Nancy Hayton when she was struggling in school due to her sister Becca Dean's murder, and later when Nancy accused of sexual harassment. Mrs. Webster's son Pete Webster worked as a teacher and sexually harassed Tina McQueen in October 2007. Tina told Mrs. Webster, who made her son apologise. Pete later tried to force himself on Tina, fired her, and was humiliated by her sister Jacqui McQueen. In January 2008, following Michaela McQueen's overdose, she performed a spot check of all the students' lockers for drugs. She almost uncovered Fletch's drugs in his locker, but was stopped by the fire alarm.

In June 2008 she was involved in the story about Josh and Michaela cheating in their coursework. They both eventually were suspended for a week. In addition, Sasha Valentine and Fletch stole her laptop to sell for drugs but it was eventually returned. During both of these events, Mrs Webster never made an appearance.

Mrs. Wesbter was not seen on-screen again because, in November 2008, Govinda Roy, the father of Ravi Roy, Ash Roy, Anita Roy and Leila Roy, debuted as the new headmaster at Hollyoaks High.

Mercedes McQueen

Myra McQueen

Warren Fox

Diane Valentine 

Diane Valentine and her three children Calvin, Sonny and Sasha Valentine bought the home of Liz Burton and their arrival started off inauspiciously when they had to forcibly remove Liz's daughters Sophie and Mel Burton. Diane was proud of Calvin, although she was upset about his plans to leave home once he graduated from the police force. Sonny was involved in various criminal activities Diane knew nothing about. Sasha was the youngest of the family and coping with growing up.

Diane's stay in town was short-lived, on her way to her car, she dropped her keys. When she bent over to pick them up, she didn't see Jake Dean's car driving towards her and she was hit and killed.

Diane's death shattered her family, as her husband Leo Valentine showed up to try to pick up the pieces and keep the family together.

Calvin Valentine

Sasha Valentine

Sonny Valentine

Eddie Griffiths 

Edward "Eddie" Griffiths was played by actor and musician Che Watson from 2006 to 2010

Eddie is a police officer and works alongside Calvin Valentine. Eddie first appeared in 2006, when Calvin was going to move in with him. Calvin then decided not to after the death of his mother. In 2008, Eddie found drugs in Calvin's coat pocket after seeing him with Nige. The following day, Eddie confronted Calvin and told him that he was going to report him to Superintendent Lacey, but Calvin later convinced him not to.

He returned on 15 September 2008, during a routine search of The Loft. On 5 February 2009, it was revealed that he had been promoted to sergeant, although on 6 April 2010 he wore a Constable's uniform.

Tina Reilly

Leo Valentine

Carmel McQueen

Foz 

"Foz" was the boyfriend of Nancy Hayton. He is a tattooist and was working in a tattoo parlour when Nancy met him. Foz is a counter-stereotype; although heavily tattooed and pierced, he is actually philosophical, peaceful and artistic. He painted a 'realistic' memorial to those who died in The Dog fire, to the dismay of the bereaved Justin Burton. After losing the premises to his tattoo parlour, Foz decided to go back to college and he became a part-time lecturer and MA student at Hollyoaks Community College. He has a free spirited New Age mother (Willow) who made a brief appearance. According to Willow, she spent Foz's childhood taking him touring round circus and women's camps.

As of 2 January 2007, Foz has left Hollyoaks as a result of a higher calling; to serve and assist the impoverished of Goa. Nancy had agreed to go with him, but changed her mind at the last minute. They said they loved each other, and Foz said maybe he'd run into her somewhere in the world someday. His final words were, "Take care."

Kris Fisher

Zoe Carpenter

Will Hackett

John Paul McQueen

Jacqui McQueen

Davey Thomas 

"Davey Thomas" was the boyfriend of a con Jacqui McQueen met in prison. He first appeared when he demanded £10,000 from Jacqui which she had got from a men's public bathroom after doing a favour for her mate in prison with help from her sister Mercedes. On their way out they accidentally dropped the vase the money was in which meant them taking the money back to their house. When Carmel McQueen found out about the money she stole £4,000 of the money to get her boobs done. When Davey found out about this he demanded his other £6,000. Mercedes' boyfriend Russ Owen and Jacqui's mother Myra McQueen gave him what they had, but it was still not enough. Several months later, he returned, demanding Jacqui marry Albanian immigrant Aleksander Malota. Jacqui refused, but eventually gave in. On her wedding day, she again changed her mind, but Davey showed up at the wedding. During a fight with Jacqui's boyfriend Tony Hutchinson, Jacqui knocked Davey out, but when he woke up, he informed her that they were both now in debt to very powerful people who would hurt her and her family. Jacqui relented and married Aleksander. When they split up several months later, with Aleksander returning to Albania, there were no apparent consequences.

Ricky Bowen 

Richard "Ricky" Bowen is the father of McQueen siblings Carmel and Michaela McQueen. Ricky had a relationship with Myra McQueen and became stepfather to her three daughters Jacqui, Mercedes, and Tina. Ricky went on to have two more children with Myra, daughters Carmel and Michaela. While he was away with his band, Myra slept with Iain Naimsmith, before Iain began his transition to being a woman named Sally St. Claire. When Rickey returned Myra lied to Ricky and John Paul and said John Paul was Ricky's son. After youngest daughter Michaela was born, Ricky left Myra and the children for their next door neighbour, 17-year-old daughter Heather McCallister, who later gave birth to his son Richard. Ricky came in and out his children's lives. Carmel and John Paul learned not to trust their father, but Michaela wanted a chance to get to know him. She managed to get Ricky's number and he came to visit her. He told her he wanted to make up for the past, but while they were alone in the house, Ricky convinced Michaela to go out to the store. While she was gone, Ricky stole the family's Christmas gifts, liquor, and television, leaving Michaela heartbroken.

Charlie Dean 

Charles Adam "Charlie" Dean is the son of Becca Hayton and Justin Burton (Chris Fountain), Becca gave birth to him after being sentenced to imprisonment after alleged under-age activity with Justin. After Charlie was born, it was unknown whether Justin or her husband Jake Dean (Kevin Sacre) was his father. Becca originally gave Charlie to Jake, but when Justin firsts meets Charlie after stealing Jake's car Justin realizes he is the father. Jake's sister Steph Dean (Carley Stenson) convinced Jake to take a paternity test in January 2007, but Jake destroyed the results and assumed the role of Charlie's father, along with his wife and Becca's sister, Nancy Osborne (Jessica Fox). In February 2007, Becca was stabbed in prison, and dies afterwards, and Charlie never got a chance to see her.

In May 2006, Becca discovered that she was pregnant but was unaware of whether the father was Jake or Justin, whom she had been having an affair with. She initially kept the pregnancy from Justin, and let Jake believe that he was Charlie's father. However, in July 2006, Becca and Justin's affair was revealed and Jake realised that he may not be the father.

Becca chose Justin over Jake, but later changed her mind and went back to Jake, deciding that Jake would be the father, regardless of the paternity. Justin reported Becca to the police for their affair, and lied that they had begun a sexual relationship when Justin was 15. Becca was arrested and imprisoned, but in December 2006, she went into labour at her sentencing and gave birth to a son in hospital. She named the baby Charles, nicknaming him Charlie. Charlie stayed with Becca in prison. Justin eventually admitted to lying, and Becca was released. However, in February 2007, on the day she was released, Becca was stabbed by Fran Hathaway and she died in hospital.

In June 2008, Nancy took Charlie to the hospital, worrying about his high temperature. Charlie was diagnosed with leukaemia, and Jake was tested to see if he was a match for Charlie. Jake discovered that he was not a match, meaning that Justin was Charlie's father. Charlie underwent chemotherapy, which was delayed when he developed an infection. When Nancy left Jake after he attempted to rape her on their wedding night, Jake withdrew Nancy's visiting rights to Charlie, which lead Nancy to seek Justin's help to win custody of Charlie from Jake.

After Jake and Justin had a fight, Justin decided to help Nancy with the custody case, not wanting Charlie to be raised by Jake. Nancy and Jake continued to argue and fight, which resulted Nancy throwing Jake out of the flat, and Jake making Nancy appear to be an unfit parent. Outside the court room, Jake goaded Nancy into exploding at him and causing a scene. Jake was awarded custody, and revoked Nancy's visiting rights.

Jake held Charlie's christening the next day, choosing Steph and Darren Osborne (Ashley Taylor Dawson) to be Charlie's godparents. Nancy later revealed that Jake had tried to rape her on their wedding night, and her friends Sarah Barnes (Loui Batley) and Hannah Ashworth (Emma Rigby) convinced her to go to the police. Jake was arrested for attempted rape, but released. However, Steph backed up Nancy's story and Jake was exposed. Jake took Charlie in his car and drove to a remote location, attempting to kill himself and Charlie by gassing them in his car. Nancy was able to track them down and saved Charlie, but left Jake to die. However, Jake survived and came after Nancy. He attempted to take Charlie to France, but was arrested and admitted to a psychiatric hospital. Jake later confessed to the murder of Sean Kennedy (Matthew Jay Lewis) in exchange for Justin giving his parental rights to Jake's mother, Frankie Osborne (Helen Pearson).

In July 2009, Justin later went on the run, taking the blame for the fire at The Loft, saying goodbye to Charlie before his departure. Jake was later released from the psychiatric hospital, but Frankie was worried about Jake's mental health and decided to give Nancy parental rights. Charlie went missing in the care of Nancy's boyfriend, Kris Fisher (Gerard McCarthy), and everyone worried that he might have been with Jake, which he had not.

Darren and Nancy later got together, and married in a surprise ceremony in February 2012, meaning that Charlie was reunited with Jake's side of the family. In October 2012, Nancy also gave birth to a son, Oscar Osborne (Ralph & Zach Norman). In December 2012, Nancy began to struggle, however, and exploded at Charlie. Charlie, believing he was unwanted, ran away. Whilst out in the woods, Charlie slipped and knocked himself unconscious when he fell onto a tree branch. He was later discovered by Seamus Brady (Fintan McKeown) and rushed to hospital. However, Charlie had only minor injuries and was discharged not long later.

Darren and Nancy hired a nanny, Sienna Blake (Anna Passey). Sienna became obsessed with taking Nancy's place in the family. She managed to drive a wedge between Darren and Nancy, and Darren chose Sienna over Nancy. However, Charlie and Oscar preferred Nancy over Sienna. After Sienna framed Nancy for a fire at The Dog in the Pond, Nancy was seen as a danger to Charlie and Oscar.

In August 2013, Sienna later told Nancy to take Charlie and Oscar and leave. Nancy sped off with them in the car, whilst Sienna injured herself and told Darren that Nancy had attacked her and kidnapped Charlie and Oscar. Nancy panicked when she saw a police car and lead a police chase into the car park of the hospital. Nancy collided with another car, swerved and crashed through the brick wall. She managed to get both Charlie and Oscar out of the car before it fell, narrowly killing them. Nancy was arrested, upsetting Charlie.

Darren and Sienna decided to move out of 1 Stockton Lane, and tried to take Charlie with them. Frankie and her husband Jack Osborne (Jimmy McKenna) tried to stop them, but Sienna blackmailed Frankie over her knowledge of her affair with Darren's half-brother Ziggy Roscoe (Fabrizio Santino). In December 2013, Sienna later kidnapped Charlie, Oscar and Frankie's foster son Tom Cunningham (Ellis Hollins) when Nancy was released. She tried to gas them all in her car, but the police arrived and Sienna crashed whilst trying to flee. She was then arrested and Darren and Nancy eventually reconciled.

In October 2015, at the gay pride parade, Charlie witnessed Lindsey Roscoe (Sophie Austin) give Dr. Charles S'avage (Andrew Greenough) a fatal injection. Charlie was left traumatised and began having nightmares. Lindsey threatened Charlie, and he refused to speak to anyone. Nancy and Darren were concerned when Charlie began drawing dead people, and in January 2016, they eventually managed to get him to admit that he witnessed Lindsey murder Charles. However, in May 2016, Lindsey was murdered by Silas Blissett (Jeff Rawle) before facing prosecution.

In March 2017, Charlie discovered that Nancy had been researching multiple sclerosis, and worked out that she was ill with the disease. Charlie researched the disease and told Oscar that Nancy was dying, and also told Darren. Darren revealed to Nancy that Charlie knew about the illness, and Nancy told them the truth, leading to them all reconciling.

In September 2017, Darren was later arrested for drug dealing and served a prison sentence. Despite his insistence, Tom took Charlie to see Darren. In October 2017, Frankie died of a stroke, and in November 2017, Charlie and Oscar read out a eulogy at her funeral. In February 2018, whilst exploring the school, Charlie and Leah Barnes (Ela-May Demircan) almost discovered Lindsey's sister Kim Butterfield (Daisy Wood-Davis), who had been kidnapped by Ryan Knight (Duncan James), but were interrupted by Leah's adoptive father Ste Hay (Kieron Richardson).

In September 2018, Nancy and Darren split when Darren's affair with Mandy Morgan (Sarah Jayne Dunn) was revealed. Charlie eventually forgave Darren and tolerated Mandy's daughter, Ella Richardson (Erin Palmer). Meanwhile, in January 2019, he took a liking to Nancy's new boyfriend Kyle Kelly (Adam Rickitt). In October 2019, Charlie and Ella sneaked into the underground tunnels during the construction of Cunningham's Grande Bazaar, and were left trapped when the crane collapsed. However, they managed to escape. Charlie discovered that Nancy and Darren had slept together when they were trapped in the tunnels looking for Charlie and Ella, but Nancy confessed to Mandy not long afterwards in December 2019.

In January 2020, Charlie began to feel ignored by Nancy and Kyle when they had relationship problems following Nancy's miscarriage. Charlie began secluding himself, opting to spend all of his time playing video games. Charlie would occasionally play with Sid Sumner (Billy Price). However, unknown to Charlie, Sid's drug dealing cousin, Jordan Price (Connor Calland), would use Sid's account to get Charlie to think that he and Sid were friends.

In May 2020, Jordan later befriended Charlie, and asked him to hold onto a package. He then started getting Charlie to hold onto drugs, but Charlie found out and confronted Jordan. To Jordan's surprise, Charlie agreed to hold onto drugs for him, for a higher price. Kyle eventually discovered what Charlie was doing, and was torn between telling Nancy or trying to help Kyle secretly. Nancy and Kyle began having problems in their marriage and ended up splitting. In June 2020, Charlie was left distraught when Kyle took his own life following years of depression, which he had managed to keep hidden from his family. Under pressure from Jordan, Sid used the situation to manipulate a reluctant Charlie into dealing drugs for him. In October 2020, Charlie later helped Juliet Nightingale (Niamh Blackshaw) convince Ella to also deal drugs. On New Year's Eve 2020, Ella refused to smuggle drugs inside her body for dealer Victor Brothers (Benjamin O’Mahoney), so she and Charlie hid in The Hutch. They were found by Jordan, unaware that he was planning to help Juliet and Sid escape from Victor. Charlie grabbed Jordan's knife and stabbed him to defend himself, but Ella grabbed a knife from the kitchen and fatally stabbed Jordan.

In the aftermath, Charlie made an immediate false confession to P.C George Kiss (Callum Kerr) and arrested. In January 2021, Charlie wasn't released on bail, and was informed by solicitor James Nightingale (Gregory Finnegan) that he could be facing seven years imprisonment. In March 2021, Charlie wrote a letter to Ella, explaining that he planned to tell the truth. The letter was used by Nancy as evidence to have Charlie released and Ella arrested. Charlie, however, omitted Mandy's involvement in his detaining. In August 2021, Ella was given a non-custodial sentence for Jordan's death, she moved into the Osborne’s house due to her strained relationship with Mandy. In September 2021, bonding over spending time in prison, Charlie and Ella began to grow close and embarked on a secret relationship, later exposed when Nancy mistakenly believed that Leah was Charlie's girlfriend. The relationship soon became sexual, and in October 2021, Ella later worried that she was pregnant until a test came back negative.

Other characters

References 

, Hollyoaks
2006